Crimdon is a village in County Durham, England. It is situated on the North Sea coast, between Blackhall Rocks and Hartlepool on the A1086 road. Crimdon was formerly a popular holiday resort for miners and their families from nearby towns and villages, on account of its affordability for low-income workers. During the 1960s Butlins took an interest in buying the Crimdon Dene Holiday Park there from Easington District Council, but the sale was declined as Butlins intended to charge people to use the beach. The 1970s and 80s saw Crimdon's decline as a resort as the popularity of foreign travel increased. The holiday park is now owned by Parkdean Resorts but there are few facilities, unlike the case in the past, when there was a fairground and pavilion. Park Resorts have built a new clubhouse with a bar, a restaurant, and an indoor swimming pool since buying the holiday park from Easington District Council. There are also two smaller holiday parks at Crimdon—Denemouth Caravan Park and Evergreen Park. Crimdon Dene is a local nature reserve between the A1086, Crimdon Viaduct, and the beach. Crimdon Beck runs through the dene, which normally has a dried up stream bed in places during the summer. Terns now nest on the beach and the area has become popular with birdwatchers as tourism has waned.

References

External links 

Villages in County Durham